Miss Panda and Mr. Hedgehog is a 2012 South Korean television series starring Lee Donghae of Super Junior and Yoon Seung-ah. Produced by Song Hae-sung's TV production venture Lion Fish, it aired on Channel A from August 18 to October 7, 2012 on Saturdays and Sundays at 21:55 for 16 episodes.

Plot
The story revolves around Go Seung-ji (Lee Donghae), a talented patissier who exudes a cold and tough exterior (like a hedgehog) which conceals his kind and understanding heart, and Pan Da-yang (Yoon Seung-ah), an optimistic and easygoing cafe owner with a laid-back personality (like a panda).

Cast
Lee Donghae as Go Seung-ji, an ex-con amnesiac turned patissier whose nickname means hedgehog
Yoon Seung-ah as Pan Da-yang, an orphan who manages her parents' crisis-hit patisserie
Choi Jin-hyuk as Choi Won-il, CEO of prominent patisserie Saint-Honore, and childhood friend of Pan Da-yang
Yoo So-young as Kang Eun-bi 
Lee Moon-hee as Park Mi-hyang
Yang Hee-kyung as Kim Kap-soon
Han Soo-min as Pan Da-na, the younger but wiser sister of Pan Da-yang
Yoo Seung-mok as Kil Dong-goo
Hyun Suk as Choi Jae-kyum, President of Saint-Honore at severe odds with stepson and CEO Won-il
Hong Yeo-jin as Hwang Jung-rye
Song In-hwa as Choi Won-yi, tomboyish sister of Choi Won-il, and shareholder of Saint-Honore
Park Sang-hoon as Jo Kyun-woo
Park Ha-na as Park Ha-na
Nam Ji-hyun as herself

Soundtrack
 "Plz Don't" - Lee Donghae
 "Loving You" - Super Junior-K.R.Y
 "Inverted Love" - Choi Jin-hyuk
 "Promise" - Kwon Soon-il (Urban Zakapa)
 "Don't Go" - Lee Donghae
 "Love Stops" - Park Ha-na

Notes

References

External links
  
 
 

2012 South Korean television series debuts
2012 South Korean television series endings
Channel A television dramas
Korean-language television shows
South Korean romantic comedy television series
Television series about hedgehogs
Television series about pandas